Puszcza is a Polish term for a large forest. It may also refer to the following villages:
Puszcza, Kuyavian-Pomeranian Voivodeship (north-central Poland)
Puszcza, Łódź Voivodeship (central Poland)
Puszcza, Lublin Voivodeship (east Poland)
Puszcza, Masovian Voivodeship (east-central Poland)
Puszcza, Greater Poland Voivodeship (west-central Poland)
Puszcza, Lubusz Voivodeship (west Poland)

See also